Arturo Cavero may refer to:

Arturo "Zambo" Cavero, Afro-Peruvian singer
Arturo Cavero Calisto,  Peruvian politician